Polyhymno erratica is a moth of the family Gelechiidae. It was described by Anthonie Johannes Theodorus Janse in 1950. It is found in South Africa (in what was the Orange Free State).

References

Endemic moths of South Africa
Moths described in 1950
Polyhymno